The 2019 Big Ten Conference Men's Ice Hockey Tournament was the sixth tournament in conference history. It was played between March 8 and March 23, 2019, on-campus locations. By Winning the tournament Notre Dame earned the Big Ten's automatic bid to the 2019 NCAA Division I Men's Ice Hockey Tournament.

Format
The 2019 tournament features a format with all games taking place on the campus of the higher-seeded teams. The tournament opens March 8-10 with three best-of-three quarterfinal series, as the second, third and fourth-seeded teams each hosting a series. The top-seeded team has a bye to the single-elimination semifinals, which is played on March 16. The highest-seeded team remaining after the semifinals hosts the championship game on March 23.

Conference standings

Bracket
Teams are reseeded for the semifinals

Note: * denotes overtime periods.

Quarterfinals

(2) Notre Dame vs. (7) Michigan State

(3) Minnesota vs. (6) Michigan

(4) Penn State vs. (5) Wisconsin

Semifinals

(2) Notre Dame vs. (3) Minnesota

(1) Ohio State vs. (4) Penn State

Championship

(2) Notre Dame vs. (4) Penn State

Tournament awards

All-Tournament Team
 G: Cale Morris* (Notre Dame)
 D: Andrew Peeke (Notre Dame)
 D: Spencer Stastney (Notre Dame)
 F: Cam Morrison (Notre Dame)
 F: Liam Folkes (Penn State)
 F: Alex Limoges (Penn State)
* Most Outstanding Player

References

Big Ten Men's Ice Hockey Tournament
Big Ten Men's Ice Hockey Tournament